The South Dakota Hall of Fame is an American award for excellence among South Dakotans. Established in 1974, the South Dakota State Legislature named the organization the state's official hall of fame in 1996. The Hall is a museum detailing "acts of excellence", the host of an annual honors ceremony, a statewide K-12 South Dakota History Program, and a Visitor and Education Center in Chamberlain that opened in June 2000. More than 700 South Dakotans have been inducted into the Hall of Fame, and their stories of excellence with supporting media are available online.

Notable inductees
James Abourezk
George "Sparky" Anderson
Tom Brokaw
Sitting Bull
Eagle Woman, also known as Matilda Galpin
Crazy Horse
Joe Foss
Ralph Herseth
Emil Loriks (charter member)
George McGovern
Donald E. Messer
Richard F. Pettigrew
Watson Parker, historian of the Black Hills, inducted in 2011.
Harold Spitznagel
Korczak Ziolkowski
Ruth Ziolkowski

See also
List of museums in South Dakota

References

External links

Chamberlain, South Dakota
Halls of fame in South Dakota
South D
History museums in South Dakota
Museums in Brule County, South Dakota